The 1956 Atarfe-Albolote earthquake was a magnitude 5.0  earthquake that occurred at 18:38 CEST (17:38 UTC) on April 19, 1956. The earthquake affected a wide area, and especially the area between Sierra Elvira and Granada. According to the press at the time, the towns of Atarfe and Albolote were ruined and Santa Fe, Maracena and some neighborhoods in the capital of Granada were badly affected. The earthquake registered an epicentral intensity of VIII, a magnitude of 5.0 and a hypocentral depth of 6.3 km. Numerous aftershocks occurred, of which the most important were recorded between April 19 and May 8. Twelve people died and 60 were left injured. Among other effects, the earthquake caused rockfalls in Sierra Elvira and landslides along the Beiro River.

Geology 

The province of Granada, is located in the morphostructural unit constituted by the Betic Cordilleras, they constitute a set of mountainous alignments, basically formed by the stacking of structures pushed by the Iberian and African Plates. In the Granada Basin, the areas that have suffered the most from the effects of earthquakes, with an intensity equal to or greater than VI, have been those of Alhama de Granada and the Santa Fe-Pinos Puente-Albolote triangle. In the case of the so-called Iznalloz fault, the maximum expected magnitude is 7; others may exceed magnitude 6.

During the 20th and 21st century, the most notable were: on June 16, 1910, in Adra; Los granadinos in 1911; on July 5, 1930, in Montilla; on March 5, 1932, in Vícar; those of the province of Jaén of 1951 in Andújar, Bailén and Linares; on June 9, 1964, in Galera and Orce; the Adra earthquake swarn of 1993 and 1994; and on May 11, 2011 in Lorca.

Earthquake 

The earthquake began at 18:38 and spread panic especially in the area between Sierra Elvira and Granada, alarming almost the entire province. The following day's press cited the towns of Atarfe and Albolote as ruined, and Santa Fe, Maracena and some neighborhoods of the capital badly affected. They asked the government for help. The human losses totaled 7 direct deaths and 5 due to a landslide next to the Beiro in Granada due to the collapse of a cave, located next to the path of the Casería de Montijo. As a consequence of the earthquake and the effects of the rain, a large crack was made in the hillside. On April 20 at 14:00, some 5,000 m³ of earth fell. A married couple with 3 children lived in the cave, they all died. In this same place in 1945 another landslide caused 4 deaths. In addition, there is talk of about 40 injured, several hundred homes destroyed, many others uninhabitable, serious breakdowns and material damage amounting to 20 million pesetas at the time. One of the wounded died on April 25. These damages were increased by the numerous aftershocks that followed for several weeks. The epicenter was located between Albolote and Atarfe, an area that lacks settlements and crops, so the damage was not increased.

Within a radius of 10 km around, it reached grade VII, which covers the capital and some twenty towns in La Vega. It had a shallow focal depth of 6,3 km.

The violent earthquake lasted about four seconds, causing cracks and detachment of plaster at the joints of the walls and windows, falling objects, stopped watches, etc. In Albolote the walls suffered more, cracks in church columns, rockfall in Sierra Elvira, rupture and fall of chimneys, cornices, movement of trees, general underground noise noticed in quite remote towns. Strange phenomena is described by the population as a current of air, fire and stones coming from the Cañada called Tajo Colorado that seemed to come out of the Raja Santa although a Group of Speleologists from Granada denied it in the press. The earthquake that occurred on June 4, 1955, affected Atarfe and caused material damage. Some people say that they saw a glow of a reddish-yellowish globe in the early hours of the morning.

The most important aftershocks were recorded between April 19 and May 8. In some days several more or less strong shocks occurred, registering 116 important aftershocks.

References 

1956 earthquakes
Earthquakes in Spain